Somena moorei is a moth in the family Erebidae. It was described by Pieter Cornelius Tobias Snellen in 1879. It is found on Sulawesi.

References

Moths described in 1879
Lymantriinae